María Luisa "Malu" Trevejo (born October 15, 2002) is a Cuban-Spanish singer. She became famous for her videos on the video sharing app Musical.ly. She is now also an Instagram personality with more than 10 million followers. On September 22, 2017, she released her debut single, "Luna Llena" with In-Tu Linea and Universal Music Latin. It has acquired over 100 million views on her YouTube channel as of November 2019. Not long after, she released another single "En Mi Mente" which has surpassed 10 million views.

Early life and career beginnings 
María Luisa Trevejo was born in Havana, Cuba, to a Cuban mother and Spaniard father. She moved to Madrid, Spain with her mother when she was still a baby and lived there along with her Spanish father for 12 years. During her time in Spain, Trevejo showed a lot of interest in acting especially with skit videos she did with her friends, recorded by her parents. She began belly dancing at an early age, and uploaded videos of her engaging in this activity to the Internet, which garnered her first public attention. She stayed in Spain until she was 13 then moved to Miami, Florida with her mother.

Shortly after, she opened a Musical.ly (today known as TikTok) account, and gathered a following the eventually numbered in the millions. She posted lip-syncing videos, and then became a verified user.

Trevejo signed a recording agreement and co-management agreement with In-Tu Linea and Universal Music Latin at the age of 14. On September 22,  2017, she released her debut single "Luna Llena" which accumulated over 113 million views on YouTube.

Career 
Her debut single "Luna Llena", which was produced by the Fliptones, reached 33 million YouTube views within seven weeks of release. Trevejo was recognized as one of Pandora Radio's 2018 Latin Artists to Watch. Trevejo indicated that her album would be in Spanglish, including both English and Spanish-language songs. In June 2017, she signed with In-Tu Linea and Universal Music Latin. "Luna Llena" debuted on the Billboard Hot Latin Songs chart at number 27 and sold over 2,000 downloads at the time. A re-make of the song called "Luna Llena (English Version)" was released for non-Spanish speakers.

On August 2, 2019, Trevejo released a four-track EP called Una Vez Más. Her single "Luna Llena" peaked at number 18 on the Hot Latin Songs chart for two consecutive weeks, and was certified gold and platinum within a month.

In October 2020, Trevejo signed with new management and relocated to the Los Angeles area. On her 18th birthday, she created an OnlyFans account, accumulating over 37,000 subscribers in the first week.

In October 2021, she reported on social media that she had signed to rapper Travis Scott's record label Cactus Jack Records and Atlantic Records. Later that month, she released her new song "Complicado" featuring Luar La L. The song was released under Cactus Jack and Atlantic. She was later dropped from Cactus Jack.

Discography

EPs

Singles

See also
List of Cuban Americans

References

External links 

2002 births
Living people
Cuban female dancers
Cuban emigrants to the United States
Cuban emigrants to Spain
21st-century Cuban women singers
Musicians from Havana
Spanish-language singers of the United States
Universal Music Latin Entertainment artists
Video bloggers
OnlyFans creators
Atlantic Records artists